Charles Buller (1806–1848) was a British barrister, politician and reformer.

Charles Buller may also refer to:

Charles Buller (cricketer, born 1892)
Charles Buller (cricketer, born 1846)

See also
 Charles Buller Heberden (1849–1921), English classical scholar